Giovanni Griffith (9 October 1934 – 13 January 1990) was an Italian professional football player.

He was born in Parma, and played for 5 seasons (150 games, 4 goals) in the Serie A for U.S. Città di Palermo, A.S. Roma and Atalanta B.C. He had to end his career at a relatively young age due to serious injuries (fractured tibia and fibula).

References

1934 births
1990 deaths
Italian footballers
Serie A players
Parma Calcio 1913 players
Palermo F.C. players
A.S. Roma players
Atalanta B.C. players
U.S. Alessandria Calcio 1912 players
Association football defenders